Geratal is a municipality in the district Ilm-Kreis, in Thuringia, Germany. It was created with effect from 1 January 2019 by the merger of the former municipalities of Frankenhain, Geraberg, Geschwenda, Gossel, Gräfenroda and Liebenstein. The name refers to the river Gera.

References

Municipalities in Thuringia
Ilm-Kreis